The 1937 Auburn Tigers football team represented Auburn University in the 1937 college football season. The Tigers' were led by head coach Jack Meagher in his fourth season and finished the season with a record of six wins, two losses and three ties (6–2–3 overall, 4–1–2 in the SEC).

Schedule

References

Auburn
Auburn Tigers football seasons
Orange Bowl champion seasons
Auburn Tigers football